Youssoupha Sarr (16 October 1978 – May 2002) was a Senegalese sprinter. He competed in the men's 4 × 400 metres relay at the 2000 Summer Olympics.

References

1978 births
2002 deaths
Athletes (track and field) at the 2000 Summer Olympics
Senegalese male sprinters
Olympic athletes of Senegal
Place of birth missing